Nenteria is a genus of mites in the family Nenteriidae.

Species
 Nenteria africana Wisniewski & Hirschmann, 1993     
 Nenteria americana Wisniewski & Hirschmann, 1993     
 Nenteria anormalis Wisniewski & Hirschmann, 1986     
 Nenteria australiensis Hirschmann & Hiramatsu, 1978     
 Nenteria baloghi Hirschmann, 1973     
 Nenteria bellissima Wisniewski & Hirschmann, 1988     
 Nenteria breviperitremata Masan, 1999     
 Nenteria cambodgeana Wisniewski & Hirschmann, 1993     
 Nenteria camerunis Wisniewski & Hirschmann, 1990     
 Nenteria crassa Hirschmann, 1985     
 Nenteria floralis Karg, 1986     
 Nenteria hexalis Karg, 1986     
 Nenteria jilinensis Ma, 1998     
 Nenteria kieviana Wisniewski & Hirschmann, 1993     
 Nenteria lindquisti Hirschmann, 1978     
 Nenteria maeandralis Hirschmann, 1985     
 Nenteria magna Hirschmann, 1985     
 Nenteria peruana Wisniewski & Hirschmann, 1993     
 Nenteria pictor (Berlese, 1916)     
 Nenteria porula Hirschmann, 1985     
 Nenteria quasikashimensis Ma, 2000     
 Nenteria rotunda Hirschmann, 1985     
 Nenteria schizostructura Hirschmann, 1978     
 Nenteria schusteri Hirschmann, 1972     
 Nenteria sinica Ma, 1998     
 Nenteria slovaca Masan, 1999     
 Nenteria tropica (Oudemans, 1905)     
 Nenteria tropicasimilis Hirschmann & Wisniewski, 1985     
 Nenteria vietnamensis Hirschmann, 1981

References

Mesostigmata
Acari genera